Micky Ward (born 9 January 1979 in Wallsend, Tyne and Wear, England) was a rugby union player for Newcastle Falcons in the Guinness Premiership. Ward played as a Prop. He is currently Forwards coach at Newcastle Falcons.

Whilst at Newcastle he started in both the 2001 and 2004 Anglo-Welsh Cup finals as Newcastle emerged victorious from both. He left Newcastle in 2011 to join Blaydon RFC.

References

External links
Newcastle profile
Falcons Rugby profile
England profile

1979 births
Living people
English rugby union players
Newcastle Falcons players
Rugby union players from Wallsend
Rugby union props